Serratia symbiotica is a species of bacteria that lives as a symbiont of aphids. In the aphid Cinara cedri, it coexists with Buchnera aphidicola, given the latter cannot produce tryptophan. It is also known to habitate in Aphis fabae. Together with other endosymbionts, it provides aphids protection against parasitoids.

References

Further reading
Genome analysis:

External links
Type strain of Serratia symbiotica at BacDive -  the Bacterial Diversity Metadatabase

Bacteria described in 2005
Enterobacterales